Noor is a two-act play by Akbar Ahmed about the abduction of a young woman named Noor and her three brothers who represent currents inside modern Muslim communities: a Sufi, a secular government bureaucrat, and an angry fundamentalist.

Characters
Main characters
 Abdullah (oldest brother, professor, idealistic Sufi)
 Daoud (middle brother, medical doctor, hardened religious literalist)
 Ali (youngest brother, lawyer and government bureaucrat, relatively secular)
 Father (Assad Hussain)
 Auntie Fatima (father's sister)
 Noor (youngest sibling, a bright college student)

Secondary characters
 Three soldiers
 Sheikh Moinuddin
 Disciple
 Flunky
 Fadel (truck driver)

Plot

Act 1
It is Ramadan.  Daoud comes home and talks with his brother Abdullah.  Soldiers of unknown background have abducted their younger sister Noor.  Daoud is angry and blames Americans for this and most of the world's other woes.  Abduallah urges calm and compassion.  Ali returns and recounts the abduction of Noor and his own detention.  Aggressive soldiers break into the house to search it, then leave.  About Noor, Abduallah proposes consulting a Sufi sheikh. At the same time, Ali recommends he use his connections in a government ministry, and Daoud implies an act of violence would be the best response.

Act 2

Scene One
In search of Noor, Abduallah consults a Sufi sheikh and Ali speaks with a government minister.  Neither approach produces results.

Scene Two
Auntie Fatima, Noor's aunt and mother of Noor's finance Rahman, expresses concern that in detention Noor's "honor" may have been violated and has come to call off the engagement.  The three brothers defend Noor and try to point out she loves Rahman and that love itself should triumph, and their father goes to talk to his sister Fatima.  To bring back Noor, Abduallah prays, while Daoud blames "the Crusaders" and urges violence; they disagree about the true nature of Islam.  Noor returns.  She is strong and wise, and brings peace to the three brothers' disagreements.

Performances
The play Noor premiered at Theater J in Washington, D.C. in 2007.

References
Akbar Ahmed, Akbar Ahmed: Two Plays.  London: Saqi Books, 2009.

External links

 

2007 plays
Plays by Akbar S. Ahmed
Islam in fiction
Pakistani plays
Middle East in fiction
Pakistani-American literature